St. Albans Township Township may refer to the following townships in the United States:

 St. Albans Township, Hancock County, Illinois
 St. Albans Township, Licking County, Ohio